Osvaldo Iván Centurión (born August 5, 1988 in Isidro Casanova, Argentina) is an Argentine footballer currently playing as a centre back for Aldosivi.

On December 14, 2016, Centurión transferred to Liga MX team Puebla FC.

Career statistics

Club

Notes

References

External links

1988 births
Living people
Argentine footballers
Argentine expatriate footballers
Association football midfielders
Primera Nacional players
Uruguayan Primera División players
Liga MX players
Club Atlético Platense footballers
Club Almirante Brown footballers
C.A. Cerro players
Club Puebla players
Expatriate footballers in Uruguay
Expatriate footballers in Mexico
Sportspeople from Buenos Aires Province